All You Who Sleep Tonight, is a 1990 collection of poems by Vikram Seth.

British composer Jonathan Dove set eight of the quatrains and five other poems to music for Nuala Willis in a 1996 song cycle of the same name.

The collection is grouped into five sections:
 Romantic Residues, poems which reflect on feelings of love and their effects, or after-effects
 In Other Voices, poems from the viewpoint of people in other times and places, such as a doctor in Hiroshima on the day of the atomic bomb
 In Other Places, poems about places and people encountered in his travels
 Quatrains, four-line poems on themes as diverse as insomnia and table manners
 Meditations of the Heart, ranging from admiration of the Russian dissident poet Irina Ratushinskaya to the title poem of the volume.

A selection of the poems has been set by British composer Jonathan Dove, and recorded on an award winning CD for the  Naxos label by mezzo soprano Patricia Bardon and pianist Andrew Matthews-Owen
All You Who Sleep Tonight

All you who sleep tonight 
Far from the ones you love,
No hand to left or right
And emptiness above -
Know that you aren't alone
The whole world shares your tears,
Some for two nights or one,
And some for all their years.

References

Indian English poetry collections
Poetry by Vikram Seth
Vintage Books books
1990 poetry books